Əhmədli is a village and the least populous municipality in the Shamkir District of Azerbaijan. It has a population of 92.

References

Populated places in Shamkir District